Conus scottjordani is a species of sea snail, a marine gastropod mollusk in the family Conidae.

Original description
 (of Cylindrus scottjordani Poppe, Monnier & Tagaro, 2012) Poppe G.T., Monnier E. & Tagaro S.P. (2012) New Conidae from the central Philippines. Visaya 3(5): 47-56. [March 2012]
page(s): 47.

References

External links
 Worms Link
  Puillandre N., Duda T.F., Meyer C., Olivera B.M. & Bouchet P. (2015). One, four or 100 genera? A new classification of the cone snails. Journal of Molluscan Studies. 81: 1-23.

scottjordani